
Gmina Cybinka is an urban-rural gmina (administrative district) in Słubice County, Lubusz Voivodeship, in western Poland, on the German border.

The gmina contains part of the protected area called Krzesin Landscape Park.

Villages
Gmina Cybinka contains the villages and settlements of Białków, Bieganów, Drzeniów, Grzmiąca, Kłopot, Krzesin, Maczków, Mielesznica, Radzików, Rąpice, Sądów and Urad. (2019–2024)

Neighbouring gminas
Gmina Cybinka is bordered by the gminas of Gubin, Maszewo, Rzepin, Słubice and Torzym. It also borders Germany.

Twin towns – sister cities

Gmina Cybinka is twinned with:
 Amt Brieskow-Finkenheerd, Germany

References

Cybinka
Słubice County